Burgholzhausen vor der Höhe station is a railway station in the Burgholzhausen vor der Höhe district of Friedrichsdorf, located in the Wetteraukreis district in Hesse, Germany.

References

Railway stations in Hesse
Buildings and structures in Wetteraukreis